Doc is an American sitcom produced by MTM Enterprises which aired on CBS from August 16, 1975, to October 30, 1976.

Synopsis
Doc starred Barnard Hughes as Dr. Joe Bogert, an elderly, kindhearted general practitioner who divided his time between dealing with his dysfunctional patients and his even more dysfunctional family.  Hughes had been seen occasionally on the CBS-TV sitcoms All in the Family as Father John Majeski and on The Bob Newhart Show as Bob's father Herb Hartley. On Doc, actress Elizabeth Wilson costarred with Hughes as Joe's wife Annie, Judith Kahan as his daughter Laurie, John Harkins as Laurie's husband, and Mary Wickes as Joe's nurse, Tully.

During the first season, the show had good ratings, partially due to its timeslot (Saturdays at 8:30 p.m., sandwiched between mega-hits The Jeffersons and The Mary Tyler Moore Show). CBS, however, thought the ratings should be better considering the scheduling and ordered that the show be reworked. When it returned in the fall of 1976, the format had been substantially changed, with Dr. Bogert now a widower, working at a down-and-out city clinic.  Mary Wickes was the only other cast member from the first season to remain, but she departed after the first episode.  Ratings slipped and the series was canceled in October 1976 after five episodes. Shortly after the series ended, Hughes returned to The Bob Newhart Show to guest-star in a Christmas episode in December 1976.

Cast
 Barnard Hughes as Dr. Joe "Doc" Bogert
 Elizabeth Wilson  as Annie Bogert (season 1)
 Judith Kahan as Laurie Bogert Fenner (season 1)
 John Harkins as Fred Fenner (season 1)
 Mary Wickes as Nurse Beatrice Tully
 Irwin Corey  as Happy Miller (season 1)
 Audra Lindley as Janet Scott (season 2)
 David Ogden Stiers (Stanley Moss (season 2)
 Herbie Faye as Ben Goldman (season 2)
 Ray Vitte as Woody Henderson (season 2)

Episodes

Season 1 (1975–76)

Season 2 (1976)

External links

 

1970s American sitcoms
1975 American television series debuts
1976 American television series endings
CBS original programming
1970s American medical television series
Television series about dysfunctional families
Television shows set in New York City
Television series by MTM Enterprises